Dennis Quigley (7 December 1913 – 1984) was a Scottish professional footballer.

References

1913 births
1984 deaths
Scottish footballers
Dundee F.C. players
Brechin City F.C. players
Grimsby Town F.C. players
Hull City A.F.C. players
Association football forwards